Nick Bebout (born May 5, 1951 in Riverton, Wyoming), was an American football player who played at offensive tackle for three teams over an 8-year career from 1973 to 1980.  Bebout played high school football for Shoshoni, Wyoming, and later went on to play for the University of Wyoming.  In his NFL career, he started with the Atlanta Falcons, moved to the Seattle Seahawks in 1976, and ended with the Minnesota Vikings in 1980.

References
 

1951 births
American football offensive tackles
Living people
Atlanta Falcons players
Seattle Seahawks players
Minnesota Vikings players
People from Riverton, Wyoming